Roos Gailen Saiyen Hamaar is a Bhojpuri film released in 1988 directed by Nazir Hussain.

References

External links

1980s Bhojpuri-language films